McCraw is a surname. Notable people with the surname include:

John McCraw (1925–2014), New Zealand pedologist, academic and historian
Kim McCraw (born c. 1969), Canadian film producer
Louise Harrison McCraw (1893–1975), American writer and philanthropist
Thomas K. McCraw (born 1940), American historian
Tommy McCraw (born 1940), American baseball player
William McCraw (died 1955), Texas Attorney General and lawyer

See also
McCraw Glacier, a glacier of Antarctica
McCraw Cemetery, a historic cemetery in Jacksonville, Arkansas, United States
R. v. McCraw, a Supreme Court of Canada case about rape threats